Srednekolymsk Airport  is an airport serving the urban locality of Srednekolymsk, Srednekolymsky District, in the Sakha Republic of Russia. The distance to Srednekolymsk town center is 1 km. The runway is almost directed north/south and the approach/take-off is straight over the town if using the south side of the runway.

Airlines and destinations

References

External links
 Official site

Airports built in the Soviet Union
Airports in the Arctic
Airports in the Sakha Republic